"Acrobat" is a song by South Korean rapper Jo Gwang-il. It was released on April 1, 2020, by Dippin' Carls Records.

Music and lyrics 
Gwangil Jo compare himself to an acrobat riding a rope. He expresses confidence and wild ambition in his lyrics. Hip-hop fans commented that "Acrobat is not just a fast rap song but a song with a groovy rhythm."

Accolades 
"Acrobat" was nominated for hip-hop track of the year at the Korean Hip-hop Awards. According to netizens, it is "the best hip hop song of the year without any doubt" as it "gave a fresh shock in the hip-hop scene where auto-tuned melodic rap is the trend."

Year-end lists

Charts

Remix 
"Acrobat Remix" (Korean: 곡예사 Remix) is the remix of "Acrobat" by South Korean rappers Gwangil Jo, Basick, P-Type, Skull, Sikboy, Olltii, Minos, Brown Tigger, and Jazzmal. It was released on October 16, 2020 by Dippin' Carls Records as the tenth track of Gwangil Jo's album Dark Adaptation.

Critical reception 
"Acrobat Remix" was nominated for collaboration of the year at the Korean Hip-hop Awards. According to netizens, it has "the most spectacular line-up of this year's collaboration and beat that entertains the ear."

Note

References 

2020 songs
Korean-language songs
Hip hop songs